Verlaat may refer to:

Frank Verlaat (born 1968), Dutch footballer
Woerdense Verlaat, town in South Holland
Boterdorpse Verlaat, lock in Rotterdam
Nieuw Verlaat, station of the Rotterdam Metro
Berg en Broeksche Verlaat, canal lock in Rotterdam